Tamryn van Selm (born 27 January 2004) is an English international swimmer. She has represented England at the Commonwealth Games.

Biography
Van Selm was educated at Newstead Wood School, Millfield School and the North Carolina State University and swims for the Bromley Swimming Club. She joined the British Swimming World Class Programme in 2020. At the 2022 British Swimming Championships she reached the final of the 100m, 200m and 400m freestyle events.

In 2022, she was selected for the 2022 Commonwealth Games in Birmingham where she competed in three events; the women's 200 metres freestyle, finishing in 13th place, the women's 400 metres freestyle and the 4 × 200 metres freestyle relay, where she won a bronze medal.

References

External links
 
 
 

2004 births
Living people
English female swimmers
British female freestyle swimmers
Commonwealth Games bronze medallists for England
Commonwealth Games medallists in swimming
Swimmers at the 2022 Commonwealth Games
European Aquatics Championships medalists in swimming
People educated at Newstead Wood School
People educated at Millfield
People from Orpington
21st-century English women
Sportspeople from London
Medallists at the 2022 Commonwealth Games